Joseph Aidan Thomas Robbins (born 20 February 2002) is an English professional footballer who plays as a midfielder for Bamber Bridge.

Career
A graduate of Crewe Alexandra's Academy, he signed a professional contract in 2020. In October 2020, he went on a month's loan to Altrincham.

Upon returning to Crewe, he made his Crewe debut on 9 November 2021 in an EFL Trophy group game against Wolves Under-21s, scoring the third goal in a 3–0 win at Gresty Road.

On 24 December 2021, Robbins went on a short-term loan to Nantwich Town of the Northern Premier League Premier Division, later extended to the end of the season. On 15 February 2022, in his 9th appearance, Robbins scored a hat-trick in the Dabbers' 5–1 win at Stalybridge Celtic.

Following Crewe's relegation to League Two, Robbins was released at the end of the 2021–22 season.

In August 2022, it was announced that he had signed for Northern Premier League Premier Division side Nantwich Town on a permanent deal, having impressed during pre-season. He left a month later on 12 September to join fellow divisional rivals Ashton United who were challenging towards the top of the table after a good start to the season.

In December 2022, Robbins signed for fellow Northern Premier League Premier Division side Bamber Bridge.

Career statistics

References

2002 births
Living people
English footballers
Association football midfielders
Crewe Alexandra F.C. players
Altrincham F.C. players
Nantwich Town F.C. players
Ashton United F.C. players
National League (English football) players
Northern Premier League players